Ravindra Choubey (born 28 May 1957) is an Indian politician from Chhattisgarh, India. He is the current Parliamentary Affairs Minister of Chhattisgarh. He earlier served as the leader of the opposition in the Chhattisgarh Legislative Assembly from 2009-13. He had also served earlier as the cabinet minister under Digvijaya Singh & Ajit Jogi.

References 

1957 births
Living people
Indian National Congress politicians from Chhattisgarh
Leaders of the Opposition in Chhattisgarh
Chhattisgarh MLAs 2018–2023
Chhattisgarh MLAs 2008–2013
Chhattisgarh MLAs 2003–2008
Madhya Pradesh MLAs 1998–2003
Madhya Pradesh MLAs 1993–1998
Madhya Pradesh MLAs 1990–1992
Madhya Pradesh MLAs 1985–1990